The Golden Meadow High School, also known as Golden Meadow Junior High School and now Golden Meadow Middle School, is a historic school building located at 630 South Bayou Drive in Golden Meadow, Louisiana.

Designed by New Orleans architects Favrot and Livaudais, the Classical Revival brick building was erected in 1931. It features a two-story central block with one-story wings on each side. Grades one through ten were taught until 1933, when the school obtained high school accreditation. The school gave opportunities for sports almost as soon as it opened, and a band was organized in 1939. Golden Meadow High stopped operations in 1966 since it consolidated with Larose-Cut Off High School to form South Lafourche High School in Galliano. The building is currently Golden Meadow Middle School.

The building was added to the National Register of Historic Places on November 23, 1998.

See also
 National Register of Historic Places listings in Lafourche Parish, Louisiana

References

External links
 Golden Meadow Middle School
 

School buildings on the National Register of Historic Places in Louisiana
Neoclassical architecture in Louisiana
School buildings completed in 1931
Educational institutions disestablished in 1966
1966 disestablishments in Louisiana
Schools in Lafourche Parish, Louisiana
National Register of Historic Places in Lafourche Parish, Louisiana